The Hittites have left a good number of texts detailing the preparation of food and many Hittite laws to stipulate how certain food is to be prepared, cooked, and served. 
The main ingredients of Hittite cuisine were dairy products, meat, grain products, and other natural products such as honey. 
Hittites loved bread and had recipes for as many as 180 types of bread in different shapes and with varying ingredients. Food eaten in Anatolia is a continuation of the Hittite cuisine as stated in the book "Hittite Cuisine" published by Alpha Publishing (08-2008) in Turkey.
Some cities have preserved the Hittite food traditions. Adana, a major city in southeast Turkey (Adaniya in Hittite in the former Neo-Hittite, Luwian Kizzuwadna region) is famous for its kebabs, and according to studies Hittite cuisine contained a strong element of meat skewer (Shish Kebab). 
Various books are written in Turkish about the Hittite cuisine and the Hittite University in Çorum in Turkey has published articles about Hittite cuisine recently.
Hittite food recipes were generally similar to that of contemporary civilizations, especially in regard to meat and dairy dishes, but were unique with regard to the plants used in cooking, as Anatolia has its own unique vegetation.
Wine was consumed by the Hittites on regular basis and used for religious festivals and rituals.

Bibliography
 Hitit Mutfağı (Hittite Cuisine), Asuman Albayrak, Metro Kultur Publishing (2008),

References

cuisine
History of Turkish cuisine